Assyrian may refer to:

 Assyrian people, the indigenous ethnic group of Mesopotamia.
 Assyria, a major Mesopotamian kingdom and empire.
 Early Assyrian Period
 Old Assyrian Period
 Middle Assyrian Empire
 Neo-Assyrian Empire
 Assyrian language (disambiguation)
 Assyrian Church (disambiguation)
 SS Assyrian, several cargo ships
 The Assyrian (novel), a novel by Nicholas Guild
 The Assyrian (horse), winner of the 1883 Melbourne Cup

See also
 Assyria (disambiguation)
 Syriac (disambiguation)
 Assyrian homeland, a geographic and cultural region in Northern Mesopotamia traditionally inhabited by Assyrian people

 Syriac language, a dialect of Middle Aramaic that is the minority language of Syrian Christians 
 Upper Mesopotamia
 Church of the East (disambiguation)

Language and nationality disambiguation pages